Zebastian Tintin Modin (born June 20, 1994) is a Swedish cross-country skier, biathlete, and Paralympian. He competed in classification B1 (visual impairment) events.

Career
He competed in biathlon and cross-country skiing at the 2010, 2014 and the 2018 Winter Paralympics, winning four medals. His first medal was the bronze medal at the men's 1 km sprint, visually impaired. His sighted guide at the 2010 and 2014 Paralympic Games was Albin Ackerot. At the 2018 Winter Paralympics his sighted guides were Johannes Andersson and Robin Bryntesson.

Zebastian Modin came in 9th place at the men's 10 km and 11th at the men's 20 km, visually impaired. 
.

References

External links

 

Everyday Heroes – Zebastian Modin: the youngest athlete of the Games on ParalympicSport.TV's official YouTube site

1994 births
Living people
Swedish male cross-country skiers
Swedish male biathletes
Paralympic biathletes of Sweden
Paralympic cross-country skiers of Sweden
Paralympic silver medalists for Sweden
Paralympic bronze medalists for Sweden
Paralympic medalists in cross-country skiing
Biathletes at the 2010 Winter Paralympics
Biathletes at the 2014 Winter Paralympics
Biathletes at the 2018 Winter Paralympics
Cross-country skiers at the 2010 Winter Paralympics
Cross-country skiers at the 2014 Winter Paralympics
Cross-country skiers at the 2018 Winter Paralympics
Cross-country skiers at the 2022 Winter Paralympics
Medalists at the 2010 Winter Paralympics
Medalists at the 2014 Winter Paralympics
Medalists at the 2018 Winter Paralympics
Medalists at the 2022 Winter Paralympics
2010 Winter Paralympians of Sweden
2014 Winter Paralympians of Sweden
2018 Winter Paralympians of Sweden
21st-century Swedish people